The Miss Peru Pageant was reinstated in 1975 and the winner was chosen by votes of readers of Gente Magazine (the official sponsor of the pageant).

That year, 23 candidates were competing for the 3 national crowns. The chosen winner represented Peru at the Miss Universe 1975, Miss World 1975, and Miss Ambar 1975. The rest of the finalists would enter in different pageants.

Placement

Special Awards

 Best Regional Costume - Áncash - María Julia Fortunic
 Miss Photogenic - Lambayeque - Francis Armendáriz
 Miss Body - San Martin - Dina Carrera
 Miss Congeniality - Callao - Myriam Llosa
 Miss Elegance - Piura - Liliana Castaneda
 Most Beautiful Face - Region Lima - Lourdes Berninzon
.

Contestants

Amazonas - Carmen Lelis Wright
Áncash - María Julia Fortunic Prado
Cajamarca - María Isabel Frías Román 
Callao - Myriam Llosa Calderón
Cuzco - Ada Millares Vriett
Distrito Capital - Mary Orfanides Helmberg
Europe Perú - Llubica Barkovich Čazporkots
Huancavelica - Mary Ann Franco Liubetti
Huánuco - Viviana Ezeta Rodríguez
Ica - Susy Marie Brescia Corvall
Junín - Rocío Ana Lazcano
La Libertad - Lidya María Solezzi
Lambayeque - Francisca Armendáriz Piedrahita 
Loreto - Susy Molgora Seminario
Madre de Dios - Luisa Malatesta Wolff
Moquegua - Patricia Céspedes La Torre
Pasco - Pilar Galindo Mujica
Piura - Liliana Castaneda Estrada
Puno - Nancy Luly Tan Jun Jumpi
Region Lima - Lourdes Berninzon
San Martín - Dina Carrera Caballero
Tacna - Maricarmen Villar Herrera
Tumbes - Carmen Olaechea Normundini

References 

Miss Peru
1975 in Peru
1975 beauty pageants